Dargon's Dungeon is a 1977 adventure published by Flying Buffalo for Tunnels & Trolls.

Gameplay
Dargon's Dungeon is a solo adventure.

Publication history
Dargon's Dungeon was first published in 1977, and a remake was published in 1981.

Reception
Forrest Johnson reviewed Dargon's Dungeon in The Space Gamer No. 43. Johnson commented that "If you enjoy pointless solo dungeons, this is a fine one."

Reviews
Different Worlds #17 (Dec., 1981)

References

Role-playing game supplements introduced in 1977
Tunnels & Trolls adventures